Gromov is a rural locality (a khutor) in Pologozaymishchensky Selsoviet of Akhtubinsky District, Astrakhan Oblast, Russia. The population was 23 as of 2010. There is 1 street.

Geography 
Gromov is located 47 km northwest of Akhtubinsk (the district's administrative centre) by road. Klochkov is the nearest rural locality.

References 

Rural localities in Akhtubinsky District